Cantonese nationalism refers to the autonomy/independence of Guangdong or Cantonese-majority areas (Guangdong with Guangxi and, sometimes, Hong Kong and Macau) from China. These movements wanted to establish an independent or autonomous political entity. In modern China, this idea has been put forward by others including Kang Youwei's followers and Ou Jiajia. Kang Youwei's followers later opposed the claim. In his book "New Guangdong", Ou Shi put forward the idea of establishing "Guangdong of Guangdong".  In 1911, there was a revolution. At the end of October 1911, members of the Guangdong Alliance Chen Jiongming, Deng Jun and Peng Ruihai organized civil army uprisings throughout Guangdong. On November 9, Chen Jiongming led his troops to restore Huizhou. On the same day, Guangdong announced independence and established the Guangdong Military Government of the Republic of China. On January 1, 1912, the Republic of China was established, and Guangdong Province became a province in the Republic of China. In the early years of the Republic of China Guangdong Province drafted the "Guangdong Provincial Draft". This is inspired by the idea of autonomous provinces. The draft passed by the Guangdong Provincial Assembly on December 19, 1921. However, this proposal for the future planning of Guangdong Province did not receive sufficient support, and it was aborted as the Soviet forces intervened in the Far East and the KMT and the Communist Party went northward.

History 

The war situation is more urgent, Ci Xi appointed Li Hongzhang as Viceroy of Zhili and Beiyang Minister. Li Hongzhang realized that the government of the Qing dynasty might begin to develop in a direction beneficial to the main party and decided to change his attitude. Before leaving, he first arrived by boat from Guangzhou to visit Hong Kong Governor Buli, and made a statement to the Hong Kong government.

During the conversation, Bu Li told Li Hongzhang: "I think that considering the current situation in North China, the moment is a good opportunity for the two Guangdong and Guangxi to separate from the Qing court. We should be ready to protect our interests" 

After the failure of the Guangdong-Guangzhou Independence Plan, He Qi continued to try to persuade Hong Kong and Britain about his ideas and plans for the transformation of the Chinese dynasty. On July 21, He Qi reported that Bu Li supported the establishment of a republic in South China. On August 1, He published an article based on the political platform in the English newspaper Dechen West 

Respondents from Guangdong and overseas Chinese in Japan, "more than 200 participants". The sponsors of the organization also visited Sun Wen, who was living in Yokohama at the time to discuss ways to raise money. The cooperation between Guangdong students studying in Japan and Xingzhong Association began.

In 1903, one year after the start of "New Guangdong", Hunan anti-Qing people studying in Japan Yang Yulin (Changsha people) published a page called "New Hunan". Yang Yulin's argument was deeply influenced by Ou Jiajia. Qia also advocated the dissolution of Ministry of China.

On May 8, 1905, the Qing Military Division sent a letter to the provincial governors to strictly ban "New Guangdong", "New Hunan", and "Xin Min Cong Bao" that promoted reform or revolution.

After the Wuchang Uprising of Hubei in 1911, various circles in Guangdong "planned Guangdong self-independence." On November 9, Guangdong Counseling Bureau announced Guangdong's independence from Qing. The gentry class in Guangdong had tasted the taste of modern political participation in the reform of the Advisory Council in the late Qing Dynasty. For them, the Xinhai Revolution was an opportunity for them to lead the practice of Guangdong's independence.

Anthropologist and historian Melissa J. Brown states in the book Does Taiwan belong to China?, "Sinification is a basic assumption in the development of Chinese civilization. It support the concept of" "China" as a nation entity ". She mentioned that this movement can be used to raise deeper questions about Chinese nationalism’s colonial behavior, and she believed that Taiwan independence would challenge those belonging to China, including Guangdong.

In Culture 
Japanese right-wing writer Masahiro Miyazaki conceived the plot of South China's division under the Sino-Japanese conflict in his 1999 military novel "China's Guangdong Army Uprising".

Japanese novelist Mori mentions Guangdong independence in two of his works. In his military novel The New Japan-China War published in 1995–2003, Morinaka writes about a plot involving Deng Xiaoping's internal power struggle in China leading to regional conflict, with Cantonese independence playing a role. Mori's later military novel The New Japan-China War-The Century of the Raging Waves which is written in the fictional 2020s, this movement is featured also.

Social impact 
At the working conference of the CPC Central Committee in April 1979, Xi Zhongxun, then the first secretary of the Guangdong Provincial Committee, raised the hope that the central government would delegate power to Guangdong Province. Hua Guofeng presiding over the meeting wondered what power Xi Zhongxun wanted. Xi Zhongxun said on the spot: "For Guangdong is an 'independent country', it may take up in a few years. Under the current system, it will not be easy." This speech caused a great response at the meeting.

On September 11, 2008, Southern Metropolis Daily published a full-page report titled "If Guangdong is an Independent Economy". The article said: "Let's imagine that if Guangdong is a country. If we try to observe China in a new way from the viewpoint of outsiders, and if China's provinces are regarded as independent countries, Guangdong will become the 14th largest economy in the world."

See also
 Secession in China
 Vietnamese nationalism
 Hong Kong independence
 Taiwan independence movement
 Demographics of China
 Ethnic minorities in China
 Ethnic issues in China
 Ethnic groups in Chinese history
 Autonomous administrative divisions of China
 Administrative divisions of China
 Autonomous regions of China
 Anti-Secession Law
 List of active separatist movements in Asia

References

External links 
 Xia Xiaohong: New Guangdong: From Politics to Literature Academic Monthly

Guangdong
Separatism in China
Independence movements